Gunstett is a commune in the Bas-Rhin department in Grand Est in north-eastern France.

Geography
The village is positioned slightly to the east of the Departmental Road RD27, a short distance north of Haguenau. The surrounding countryside is dominated by arable agriculture: the soil type is alluvial, reflecting the proximity of the river Rhine to the east.

Neighbouring villages are Oberdorf to the north, Biblisheim to the south-east, Durrenbach to the south, Morsbronn-les-Bains to the south-south-west and the formerly independent commune of Eberbach-Woerth to the West.

Points of interest
The Pear Conservation Orchard comprises 300 trees of 250 different varieties.
St Michael's Church contains an organ built in 1857 by Seltz organ builder Joseph Stiehr.
Public wash house.

See also
 Communes of the Bas-Rhin department

References

Communes of Bas-Rhin
Bas-Rhin communes articles needing translation from French Wikipedia